Liberia was planning to participate at the 2014 Summer Youth Olympics, in Nanjing, China, but on 15 August 2014 they pulled out of the games due to pressure from Chinese Authorities in an attempt to prevent Ebola from West Africa from entering their nation.

Athletics

Liberia qualified one athlete.

Qualification Legend: Q=Final A (medal); qB=Final B (non-medal); qC=Final C (non-medal); qD=Final D (non-medal); qE=Final E (non-medal)

Girls
Track & road events

Swimming

Liberia qualified one swimmer.

Boys

References

You
Nations at the 2014 Summer Youth Olympics
Liberia at the Youth Olympics